Pocadicnemis is a genus of sheet weavers that was first described by Eugène Louis Simon in 1884.

Species
 it contains seven species, found in Asia and Europe:
Pocadicnemis americana Millidge, 1976 – USA, Canada, Greenland
Pocadicnemis carpatica (Chyzer, 1894) – Central, Eastern Europe
Pocadicnemis desioi Caporiacco, 1935 – Karakorum
Pocadicnemis jacksoni Millidge, 1976 – Portugal, Spain, France, China
Pocadicnemis juncea Locket & Millidge, 1953 – Europe, Georgia
Pocadicnemis occidentalis Millidge, 1976 – USA
Pocadicnemis pumila (Blackwall, 1841) (type) – North America, Europe, Turkey, Caucasus, Russia (European to Far East), Japan

See also
 List of Linyphiidae species (I–P)

References

Araneomorphae genera
Linyphiidae
Spiders of Asia
Spiders of North America